The Vologne is a river of the Vosges department in France. It is a right tributary of the Moselle. Its source is in the Vosges Mountains, on the northwestern slope of the Hohneck. It flows through the lakes of Retournemer and Longemer, and passes the villages of Xonrupt-Longemer, Granges-sur-Vologne, Lépanges-sur-Vologne and Docelles, finally flowing into the Moselle in Pouxeux.

Geography 
The source of the Vologne is within the Jardin d'altitude du Haut Chitelet.
It flows through the lake of Retournemer and Lac de Longemer before receiving the Jamagne, a spillway of Lac de Gérardmer. It flows by Granges-sur-Vologne, receives the Corbeline, the Neuné (south of Bruyères) and the Barba at Docelles, then flows into the Moselle at Jarménil, 10 km upstream of Épinal.

Tributaries

Hydrology 
The Vologne is a substantial river, as a result of its neighbours in the region of the Vosges Mountains. Its flow rate has been observed for a period of 40 years at Cheniménil, a locality in the Vosges department situated slightly before its confluence with the Moselle.

Nonetheless these are only averages and there are significant fluctuations over short times.

Flooding of the Vologne can also be significant. The instantaneous maximal flowrate 2 (IMFR2) and IMFR5 metrics were  respectively. These values are of the order of a fifth of those of the Meurthe, and thus comparable when one takes into account the respective extents of their watersheds. It also appears from this that the floods of April 19 discussed above were of the order of 50-year floods, i.e. which might be expected to occur twice per century.

The Vologne is a very substantial river despite the relative smallness of its basin. The rainfall of the Vosges region which feeds it is also very significant. The runoff curve number in its watershed is  annually, which is very high, almost three times the ensemble average over France, and almost twice the French basin of the Moselle,  at Hauconcourt. The specific flow rate reaches 27.4 litres per second per square kilometre of basin.

Water quality 
In 2006, the Rhine-Meuse water agency assigned the Vologne's water analysed at the level of Jarménil, a quality rating of 1B, or "bonne" (good) during each of the years in the 10-year period 1997–2006, except in 2002, when the river achieved level 1A, or "très bonne" (very good). In 2006 a slightly excessive level of ammonium (NH+) ions were observed, but with an oxygen saturation of 79 percent (or 7.9 mg/L) the oxygenation was sufficient.

History and economy 

Until the beginning of the 20th century, the famous "pearls of the Vologne" were harvested. Their harvest is attested from the 16th century. The pearls, rather small, were prized by the bourgeoisie and the nobility up until the 19th century, at which time their rarity caused interest to wane. Pearl fishing was regulated and overseen by "gardes-perles" watchers. The name of lordly residence which dominates Cheniménil, the Château sur Perle, refers to the old pearl industry.

The molluscs which produce these pearls are called freshwater pearl mussels (scientific name Margaritifera margaritifera). This substantial lifetime gives rise to a very slow regeneration rate for the population, which in turn explains the quasi-disappearance of the species owing to fishing, certainly, but also to the pollution of the river by textile factories.

The textile industry itself has now almost disappeared, and while this is a cultural, economic and social setback, it has afforded the Vologne a steady improvement in water quality over recent years. Its high trout population density won it the right to hold certain rounds of the World Fly Fishing Championships in July 2002.

The upper Vologne valley is a popular destination for tourism in the Vosges department. Places to visit there, aside from the lakes, include the Saut des Cuves cascade on an ancient glacial lock, and the Pont des Fées (Fairies' Bridge) built in 1763.

The Vologne is classed as a cours d'eau de première catégorie (category 1 watercourse) over the whole of its length.

Grégory Villemin 
On 16 October 1984, the body of a four-year-old, Grégory Villemin, was found in the Vologne near Docelles. The case was highly publicised in France and became known as the Affaire Grégory. As of 2021 the case remains unsolved.

Environmental protection 
The site known as de la Vallée de la Vologne has been protected since 8 December 1910. This valley is flanked by two steep slopes rising from  that are covered from the base to the summit with ancient trees, enormous rocks or scree. The Vologne flows at the foot of the valley, past naturally growing trees and dark rocks which line its route.

See also 
 List of rivers in France

References

External links 

  Heights and flowrates of the Vologne at Cheniménil – Vigicrues website

Rivers of France
Rivers of Vosges (department)
Rivers of Grand Est